Olof Alvar Hage Ås (21 September 1892 – 4 September 1949) was a Swedish theater and film actor stage manager.

Ås was born in Stockholm, and begin his career on the stage. He then began a career in the 1910s as a stage manager. Some of his work as a stage manager includes films such as Victor Sjöström's The Lass from the Stormy Croft (Swedish: Tösen från Stormyrtorpet) (1917) and Mauritz Stiller's Gösta Berlings saga (1922), for which he also worked on special effects.

Ås made his film debut in the 1912 Paul Garbagni-directed I lifvets vår and would appear in nearly 30 films (most of them directed by either Stiller or Sjöström) until his death in Tureberg, Sollentuna Municipality, following a road accident, aged 56.

Selected filmography

References

External links

1892 births
1949 deaths
Swedish male film actors
Swedish male stage actors
Swedish male silent film actors
20th-century Swedish male actors
Male actors from Stockholm